Sakib Salajin was the mayor of Maluso in Basilan (2002–10) and is the nephew of slain political leader Wahab Akbar.  He competed for the congressional seat from Basilan in 2010, but lost to Hadjiman Hataman-Salliman.

References

Lakas–CMD politicians
Mayors of places in Basilan
Living people
Filipino Muslims
Year of birth missing (living people)
Place of birth missing (living people)